Sweden consumes about 150 terawatt hours of electricity per year, of which about 19.8 TW·h (14.2%) was generated from domestic wind power resources in 2019, up from 2.4% in 2010 and 0.3% in 2000.

In its official forecast , the Swedish Wind Energy Association (SWEA) projects that cumulative wind power capacity in the country will rise to 17.3 GW by the end of 2024 - 70% higher than 2020's roughly 10 GW. Such an expansion could increase the share of Sweden's electricity use met by wind power to over 30%.

Statistics

1 Excluding exports

Future developments
Swedish package and paper products company Svenska Cellulosa Aktiebolaget and Norwegian power company Statkraft planned in 2009 to invest 16 billion kronor (€1.73 billion; US$2.4 billion) in a  project which would consist of around 400 wind turbines in seven wind farms in Jämtland and Västernorrland counties. Statkraft will provide financing and SCA the land.

"... the wind power venture would involve production of 2,800 gigawatt hours, or GWh, of wind power electricity a year, accounting for between two to three percent of Sweden's electricity production."

The Markbygden Wind Farm is a series of wind farms in Norrbotten County, with a future capacity of up to 4 GW. 
If built out, the 55 billion kronor (€5.1 billion, US$6.9 billion) project would be the largest wind farm in Europe. 
The wind farm would cover some 450 square kilometres, comprising about 1,100 wind turbines, and is expected to produce up to 12 TW·h of electricity per year (i.e. an average power of up to 1.4 GW). , about 1.1 GW had been installed.

In 2021, the Swedish government ordered new transmission to be planned for offshore wind connections.

Controversy
The Association for Swedish Landscape Protection is in opposition to wind power. Their chairman says:

At the time of making the statement in 2011, wind power accounted for 4.3% of the electricity in Sweden as listed above. As of 2017 it accounted for 12.4%. Comparing the levelized cost of energy, as of November 2019 wind power was estimated at 28 to 54 USD per MWh, compared to 118 to 192 USD per MWh for nuclear power.

See also

 List of wind farms in Sweden
 List of offshore wind farms in Sweden
 List of offshore wind farms in the Baltic Sea
 Renewable energy in Sweden
 Biofuel in Sweden
 Energy in Sweden
 Renewable energy by country

References

External links

SWECO To Manage Wind Power Venture in Northern Sweden

 
Sweden